Angel Cat Sugar is the name of a fictional feline character created by Yuko Shimizu in 2002. The character is a white female kitten with a crown on her head and angel wings on her back and is from the fictional Angel World. Merchandise depicting the character includes products such as plush dolls, lunch boxes, towels, and books.

Characters

Sugar family
Angel Cat Sugar: (born May 17)  Called "Sugar" or "Sugar-chan" in Japanese, she is the princess of Angel World. She is depicted as a white kitten wearing a crown and possessing angel wings. She possessed the power to heal the hearts of others and make everyone happy.
Fennel: Angel Cat Sugar’s father.  A veterinarian.
Mint: Angel Cat Sugar’s mother. A nurse.

Friends 
Basil : A tomboyish girl angel.  Likes growing flowers.  Wears pink.
Thyme: A cheerful boy angel.  Cheers bashful sugar. Wears purple.
Parsley: A smart boy angel. Can be fussy at times.  Wears green.

Books 
There have been several books released in the Angel Cat Sugar franchise. There have been four books released in Japan through Yanagihara Publishing that were written and illustrated by Shimizu. In the United States the series is published through Scholastic Inc and is composed of eleven titles.

Japanese titles
 Bashful Sugar (June, 2005)
 Sugar and the Precious Eggs (December, 2005)
 Sugar and the Little Squirrel (July, 2006）
 Sugar and the Winter Gift (April, 2006)

English titles
 A New Friend
 A Special Easter
 A Wish for a Wand
 Birthday Party Surprise
 Merry Christmas, Sugar!
 Spring Picnic
 Star of the Ballet
 Sugar Loves Valentine’s Day
 Sugar’s Yummy Fall
 Sweet School Day
 Tea Party

Games
In October 2009 a game was released for the Nintendo DS and PC titled Angel Cat Sugar in the UK and Germany and Angel Cat Sugar och stormkungen in Sweden. Gameplay includes mini-games and puzzles and was targeted at pre-teens.

References

External links 

Literary characters introduced in 2002
Fictional cats
Toy brands